Marie Cyril Eddy Boissézon (born 28 March 1952) is a Mauritian politician who has been the sixth vice president of Mauritius since December 2019.

A former member of the Mauritian Militant Movement, he joined Muvman Liberater in 2014, and was the secretary general of the party. 

He was a Member of the Parliament of Mauritius from 1995 to 2000, and again from 2014 to 2019. Boissezon was appointed Minister of Civil Service and Administrative Reforms in January 2017, serving until November 2019.

Prior to his political career, he worked at Barclays Bank and later as Human Resources Manager at Scott & Co. Ltd. He was also General Manager at ATICS & Co. Ltd.

Awards and decorations 

 
  Grand Officer of the Order of the Star and Key of the Indian Ocean (2019)

References 

1952 births
Living people
Vice-presidents of Mauritius
Government ministers of Mauritius
Mauritian Militant Movement politicians
Barclays people